Snowflake is a 2017 German action film directed by Adolfo J. Kolmerer.

References

External links 

2017 films
2017 action films
German action films
2010s German-language films
2010s German films